Earth Spirit may refer to:
 Earth Spirit (play), a play by Frank Wedekind
 Earth Spirit (film), a 1923 German silent drama film by Leopold Jessner
 Earth-spirit or Erdgeist, the Spirit of the Earth whom Johann Wolfgang von Goethe describes in Faust
 Earth Spirit (Kaolin, the Earth Spirit), a playable character in the famous computer game, Defense of the Ancients.